Toraman is a Turkish surname. Notable people with the surname include:

 Emre Toraman (born 1979), Turkish footballer
 İbrahim Toraman (born 1981), Turkish footballer

See also
 Toraman, Çınar
 Toraman, Hınıs

Turkish-language surnames